Patrick Quarcoo, popularly known as PQ, is a Ghanaian Kenya-based serial entrepreneur. He is the founder and chief executive officer of Radio Africa Group, which is an umbrella of among Kenya's leading media channels on print, digital, TV and radio. This include KISS 100, Classic 105, Smooth FM, Radio Jambo, East FM, Gukena FM, the Star newspaper and KISS TV. Quarcoo and his Radio Africa Group co-founder, William Pike also own two radio stations in Uganda, Capital Radio and Beat FM. He came to Kenya from Reuters Uganda in the 90s to start up a media company. In 2012, Quarcoo was awarded an international recognition award at the Ghana UK-Based Achievement Awards.

Early life
Quarcoo was born poor in Cape Coast, Ghana. He was a young journalist when he decided to put together six radio segments – reporting on what was happening in Ghana, and then sent them to the BBC World Service. Three of these segments were taken up by BBC and soon, he was reporting regularly for the BBC, Voice of America, and other stations in London.

Radio Africa Group brands
Radio Africa Group is a leading radio, TV and newspaper business in Kenya, and it operates three of the top five radio stations in Nairobi.

References

Kenyan businesspeople
Kenyan radio people
Kenyan journalists
Kenyan radio presenters
Kenyan radio journalists
Living people
Year of birth missing (living people)